Boussanra Brousse is a town in the Tiéfora Department of Comoé Province in south-western Burkina Faso. The town has a population of 2,654.

References

Populated places in the Cascades Region
Comoé Province